Africa International University is a Christian university in Karen, Nairobi, Kenya.

History 
Africa International University was founded in 1983 as the Nairobi Evangelical Graduate School of Theology (N.E.G.S.T) through the vision of the Association of Evangelicals in Africa. The goal was to provide training for pastors beyond the basic certificate and diploma levels.

In March 2011, A.I.U was awarded a university charter by the government of Kenya and has continued to develop undergraduate programs, particularly in business, ICT, Development Studies and Counselling Psychology.

Programs
AIU offers pre-university, undergraduate, post-graduate, Masters and Ph.D programmes.

Undergraduate programs
 Bachelor of Arts in Psychology and Counselling (4 years or 2 years with credit transfer from relevant Diploma)
 Bachelor of Business Administration (4 years or 2 years with credit transfer from relevant Diploma)
 Bachelor of Theology (Th.B.) (4 years or 2 years for Theology Diploma holders)
 Bachelor of Education

Early Childhood Development
 Primary education
 Secondary education
 Bachelor of Arts in Development Studies (4 years)
 Sustainable Community Development

Urban Development
 Bachelor of Science in Entrepreneurship (4 years)
 Bachelor of Science in Accountancy and Financial Management (4 years)
 Bachelor of Science in Information Communication Technology (4 years)
 Management Information System
 Software Development
 Computer Network

Masters programs

Master of Theology (Th.M.)  (2 years)
Th.M. in Biblical Studies(2 years)
Th.M. in Mission Studies(2 years)
Th.M. in World Christianity (2 years)

Master of Divinity (M.Div.) (3 years full-time)
M.Div. in Biblical Studies
M.Div. in Church Education
M.Div. in Church History
M.Div. General
M.Div. in Mission Studies
M.Div. in Pastoral Studies
M.Div. in Theological Studies
M.Div. in Translation Studies

Master of Arts (2 years full-time, 3 years part-time)
 MA in Biblical Studies
 MA in Church History
 MA in Translation Studies
 MA in Missions
 General
 Islamic Emphasis
 MA in Organizational Leadership
 MA in Pastoral Studies
 MA in Theology
 Master of Education
 Child Development and Family Studies
 Church Education
 Curriculum & Instruction
 Educational Leadership & Administration

Doctoral programs
 Ph.D. in Education (4 years)
 Curriculum & Instruction
 Church Education
 Educational Leadership & Administration
 Child Development & Family Studies
 Ph.D. in Translation Studies
 Ph.D. in InterReligious Studies
 Ph.D. in Practical Theology (Coming soon)
 Ph.D. in Theological Studies (4 years)
 Biblical Studies
 World Christianity
 Missions studies
 Theology & Development
 Theology & Culture
 Systematic Theology

Doctor of Ministry (D.Min.) (3 years)

References

External links 
 Official Website

Universities in Kenya
Educational institutions established in 1983
1983 establishments in Kenya
Education in Nairobi